The Patriot is a 1928 semi-biographical film that was directed by Ernst Lubitsch and released by Paramount Pictures. While mainly a silent film, the film did have a synchronized soundtrack as well as some talking sequences. The movie is a biographical story of Emperor Paul I of Russia, starring Emil Jannings, Florence Vidor and Lewis Stone.

Plot
In 18th-century Russia, the Tsar, Paul, is surrounded by murderous plots and trusts only Count Pahlen. Pahlen wishes to protect his friend, the mad king, but because of the horror of the king's acts, he feels that he must remove him from the throne. Stefan, whipped by the tsar for not having the correct number of buttons on his gaiters, joins with the count in the plot. The crown prince is horrified by their plans and warns his father, who, having no love for his son, places him under arrest for his foolish accusations. Pahlen uses his mistress, the Countess Ostermann, to lure the tsar into the bedroom, where she tells him of the plot. The tsar summons Pahlen, who reassures him of his loyalty. Later that night the count and Stefan enter his bedroom, and presently the tsar is dead. But moments later Stefan turns a pistol on Pahlen. As the count lies dying on the floor, the countess appears and embraces Pahlen as he says, "I have been a bad friend and lover—but I have been a Patriot."

Cast

 Emil Jannings as Tsar Paul I 
 Florence Vidor as Countess Ostermann
 Lewis Stone as Count Pahlen
 Vera Voronina as Mademoiselle Lapoukhine
 Neil Hamilton as Crown Prince Alexander
 Harry Cording as Stefan

Tullio Carminati and Carmencita Johnson appear uncredited in this movie.

Production

Writing
The film was written by Hanns Kräly; it is an adaptation of two plays: Paul I by Dmitry Merezhkovsky and The Patriot by Ashley Dukes (based on the novel Der Patriot by Alfred Neumann). The Dukes play was performed on Broadway in January 1928. John Gielgud made his Broadway debut in that play.

Reception

Awards
It won the Academy Award for Best Writing and was nominated for Best Picture,  Best Director, Best Actor (Lewis Stone) and Best Art Direction. It was the last silent film nominated for Best Picture.

Remake

The film was remade in France in 1938 with the same title.

Preservation status
Only pieces of this film are left, including trailers. The UCLA Film and Television Archive is in possession of 2500 feet of footage (out of 10,000), and one reel was found in Portugal, but to date no complete copy has been located.

It is the only Best Picture Academy Award nominee for which no complete or near-complete copy has been found.

See also
List of lost films

References

External links

1928 films
1920s biographical drama films
American biographical drama films
American silent feature films
Films directed by Ernst Lubitsch
Films based on multiple works
American films based on plays
Films based on German novels
Films set in the 1800s
Films set in Russia
Films about assassinations
Biographical films about Russian royalty
Cultural depictions of Paul I of Russia
Lost American films
Films whose writer won the Best Adapted Screenplay Academy Award
Paramount Pictures films
American black-and-white films
1928 drama films
1920s American films
Silent American drama films